A bomb explosion occurred at the shrine of Ali al-Ridha, the eighth Imam of Shia, on 20 June 1994 in a crowded prayer hall in Mashhad, Iran. To maximize the number of casualties, the explosion took place on Ashura, one of the holiest days for Shia muslims, when hundreds of pilgrims had gathered to commemorate the death of their third Imam, Husayn ibn Ali.

The attack left at least 25 dead and at least 70 injured. The bomb was equivalent to 10 pounds of TNT, according to experts. Although a Sunni group claimed responsibility, the Iranian government laid the blame on the People's Mujahedin of Iran, and others have accused a Pakistani militant.

Bombing
On 20 June, the shrine was crowded with self-flagellating mourners, celebrating Ashura and commemorating the death of Husayn ibn Ali. At 14:26, a bomb exploded in a crowded prayer hall in the women's section of the shrine. The Independent described it as "the first attack on such a holy place" or "the worst terrorist atrocity in Iran since 1981". In protest, people gathered outside the mosque and hospitals.

Damage included the destruction of one wall and the prayer hall's dome, and the breaking of crystal chandeliers.

Suspects
The Iranian government blamed the Iraqi-backed People's Mujahedin of Iran (MEK). According to IRNA, the official Iranian news agency, a caller claimed responsibility for the event in the name of MEK. However, MEK condemned the attack. Ramzi Yousef, a member of al-Qaeda who was responsible for several terrorist attacks worldwide, was also accused of being responsible, supposedly having been hired by MEK. According to an anonymous US official, Yousef built the bomb and MEK agents placed it in the shrine. According to the analysts, he was suspected of having connections with MEK because of his Iraqi background. However, Raymond Tanter, a member of the United States National Security Council under President Ronald Reagan, believes that MEK was not involved, and that a Pakistani militant connected to Yousef was the perpetrator. News, A Pakistani daily newspaper, identified that person to be Abdul Shakoor, a young religious radical living in Lyari in Karachi.

A month after the attack, a Sunni group calling itself Al-Haraka al-Islamiya al-Iraniya claimed responsibility for the attack. Despite this, the Iranian government continued to hold the MEK responsible. According to the National Council of Resistance of Iran, in a trial in November 1999, Interior Minister Abdollah Nouri claimed it was a false flag attack by the Iranian regime to blame MEK.

Aftermath
Strict security measures were applied after this attack, and visitors are now searched before entering the shrine. The event caused further political unrest in Iran.

Portrayals
A 2013 play entitled "the picture of Aziz's event" narrated the life of a woman who was going to visit Imam Reza shrine on the day of the bombing.

See also
2006 al-Askari mosque bombing
2007 al-Askari mosque bombing
Imam Reza shrine stabbings

Notes

References

External links
A clip showing the scene after the explosion 

Explosions in 1994
1994 in Iran
Terrorist incidents in Iran in 1994
Pilgrimage sites
Attacks on religious buildings and structures in Asia
June 1994 events in Asia
Attacks on buildings and structures in Iran
1994 crimes in Iran
Imam Reza shrine